Falak or similar can mean:
 Falak, Fars, a village in Iran
 Falak, South Khorasan, a village in Iran
 al-Falaq, a sura in the Qur'an
 Falak music, a Central Asian musical genre
 The Hungarian name of the 1968 Hungarian film Walls
 Falak (Arabian legend), a giant serpent in Arabian legend
 Falak (1988 film), an Indian Hindi-language film
 Baby Falak, two-year-old Indian child abuse victim, see Death of Baby Falak